Li Chongxi (born January 1951) is a former Chinese politician. From 2013 to 2014, Li served as chairman of the Sichuan Provincial Committee of the Chinese People's Political Consultative Conference, a mostly ceremonial legislative consultation body. Prior to that, Li served as the deputy party secretary of Sichuan province. Li Chongxi has been linked to disgraced former Politburo Standing Committee member Zhou Yongkang.

Career
Li was born in Jianyang, Sichuan in January 1951. Li got involved in politics in April 1972 and he joined the Chinese Communist Party in May 1975.

After taking the National Higher Education Entrance Examination (NCEE) in 1977, Li entered Sichuan University of Finance and Economics in September 1978, majoring in public finance and graduated in August 1982. After graduation, Li worked in Chengdu as an officer.

In March 1995 he was promoted to become the vice-secretary of Garzê Tibetan Autonomous Prefecture, a position he held until March 1996, when he was transferred to Ngawa Tibetan and Qiang Autonomous Prefecture and appointed its party secretary. Li served as a Standing Committee member of the CPC Sichuan Committee and Secretary of Sichuan between August 2000 to May 2002.

Li was elevated to the deputy party secretary of Sichuan in May 2002, he remained in that position until September 2011. Li's time in provincial politics saw him work under four successive party secretaries, including Zhou Yongkang, Zhang Xuezhong, Liu Qibao, and Du Qinglin.

In January 2013, Li was promoted to become chairman of the Sichuan Provincial Committee of the Chinese People's Political Consultative Conference, earning him full provincial status for the first time in his life.

Downfall
On December 29, 2013, Li was being investigated by the Central Commission for Discipline Inspection for "serious violations of laws and regulations". On January 16, 2014, Li was dismissed from his positions. On September 11, 2014, Li was expelled from the Chinese Communist Party. His successor was selected a year later.

Li Chongxi was indicted on charges of bribery on April 17, 2015. and handed from the Party's disciplinary agents to Nanchang Municipal Intermediate People's Court. On November 3, 2015, the court found him guilty on all counts, including taking bribes worth around 11.1 million yuan (US$1.75 million). Li was sentenced 12 years in jail, and his digital recorder was also confiscated.

References

1951 births
Living people
Expelled members of the Chinese Communist Party
Chinese Communist Party politicians from Sichuan
People's Republic of China politicians from Sichuan
Politicians from Chengdu
Chinese politicians convicted of corruption